|}

The Sagaro Stakes is a Group 3 flat horse race in Great Britain open to horses aged four years or older. It is run over a distance of 1 mile 7 furlongs and 209 yards at Ascot in late April or early May.

History
The event was formerly known as the Paradise Stakes, and it was originally held at Hurst Park. For a period it was contested by three-year-olds over 1¼ miles. It was later a race for older horses over 1 mile, 6 furlongs and 66 yards.

The Paradise Stakes continued to be staged at Hurst Park until 1962. It was transferred to Ascot in 1963, and temporarily switched to Newbury in 1964.

The race was renamed the Sagaro Stakes in 1978. It was named after Sagaro, the winner of Ascot's Gold Cup in each of the preceding three seasons.

The Sagaro Stakes was given Group 3 status in 1983. That year's edition was abandoned due to waterlogging, so it was first run as a Group race in 1984.

Since 2019 the official title has indicated that the race should be considered as a trial for the Ascot Gold Cup, run at the Royal Meeting at the same course (but a half mile further) in June.

Several winners of the Sagaro Stakes have won the Gold Cup in the same season. The most recent was Estimate in 2013.

The title Paradise Stakes is now assigned to a different race at Ascot, a 1-mile Listed event for older horses.

Records
Most successful horse since 1978 (2 wins):
 Nicholas Bill – 1979, 1981
 Teamster – 1990, 1991
 Double Trigger – 1995, 1996
 Orchestra Stall – 1997, 2000
 Alcazar – 2003, 2005
 Mizzou – 2015, 2016

Leading jockey since 1978 (5 wins):
 Frankie Dettori – Al Mutahm (1992), Give Notice (2002), Colour Vision (2012), Tac De Boistron (2014), Stradivarius (2021)

Leading trainer since 1978 (6 wins):
 Sir Michael Stoute – Shangamuzo (1978), Teamster (1990, 1991), Cover Up (2006), Patkai (2009), Estimate (2013)

Winners since 1978

Paradise Stakes

 1920: Comrade
 1922: Blandford
 1923: Portumna
 1924: Frater
 1925: Dignity
 1926: Legatee
 1927: Vanoc
 1928: Lodore
 1929: Horus
 1930: Rear Admiral
 1931: Hill Cat
 1932: Robber Chief
 1933: Town Crier
 1934: Wychwood Abbot
 1935: Whataday
 1936: Noble Turk
 1937: Lazybones
 1938: Knole Star
 1939: Time Step
 1948: Mombasa
 1949: Flush Royal
 1951: Kelling
 1955: Entente Cordiale
 1956: Nucleus
 1957: China Rock
 1958: Sway
 1959: Vacarme
 1960: Parthia
 1961: High Hat
 1962: Pinzon
 1963: Orchardist
 1964: Oakville
 1965: Anselmo
 1966: Vivat Rex
 1967: Mehari
 1968: Parbury
 1969: Fortissimo
 1970: Precipice Wood
 1971: Rock Roi
 1972: Erimo Hawk
 1973: Hakodate
 1974: Proverb
 1975: Night in Town
 1976: Marco Ricci
 1977: Centrocon

See also
 Horse racing in Great Britain
 List of British flat horse races

References

 Paris-Turf:
 Racing Post:
 galopp-sieger.de – Sagaro Stakes (ex Paradise Stakes).
 ifhaonline.org – International Federation of Horseracing Authorities – Sagaro Stakes (2019).
 pedigreequery.com – Sagaro Stakes – Ascot.
 

Open long distance horse races
Ascot Racecourse
Flat races in Great Britain